Frankfurter may refer to:
 Various varieties of sausage
 Frankfurter Würstchen
 Frankfurter Rindswurst 
 Vienna sausage, or also called a Frankfurter Würstel in Austria
 Hot dog, a fully cooked sausage, traditionally grilled or steamed
 Frankfurter (surname)
 Frankfurter, a resident of Frankfurt am Main, Germany
 Any of the major newspapers from the city: Frankfurter Allgemeine Zeitung, Frankfurter Rundschau, Frankfurter Neue Presse
 Frankfurter, a resident of Frankfurt an der Oder, Germany
 Dr. Frank-N-Furter, the main antagonist in The Rocky Horror Show and its film counterpart The Rocky Horror Picture Show
 Frankfurter, a display typeface designed in 1970 for Letraset

See also
 Frankfurt (disambiguation)